The Voyage is a wooden roller coaster located at Holiday World & Splashin' Safari in Santa Claus, Indiana. Designed and built by The Gravity Group with the help of designers Mike Graham, Korey Kiepert, Larry Bill, Chad Miller, and former park President Will Koch, the roller coaster is themed to the famous voyage of the Mayflower by Pilgrims to North America in 1620. It opened to the public on May 6, 2006. It is widely considered one of the best wooden roller coasters ever built, and was awarded by TIME Magazine as the Best Roller Coaster in the world in 2013.

Also, its 24.3 seconds of air-time is the most produced on a wooden coaster to date. Another unique statistic is the ride's five underground tunnels. In 2006, it won a Golden Ticket Award for "Best New Ride" from Amusement Today magazine, which also ranked The Voyage as the "Best Wooden Roller Coaster" from 2007 through 2011.

History

Development

On July 13, 2005, Holiday World announced plans to add a new Thanksgiving section for the park's 60th anniversary. A new wooden roller coaster called The Voyage was revealed as the main attraction for the new area. The Gravity Group (a company formed from the remnants of Custom Coasters International which went bankrupt in 2002) was contracted to build the new ride. Larry Bill, a co-founder, was heavily involved in the coaster's design. Park President Will Koch also participated and is listed as one of the ride's designers. As with the development of another coaster at the park, The Legend, Koch sought input from roller coaster enthusiasts around the world. During construction, The Voyage was featured in nationally televised episodes of "SuperCoasters" on the National Geographic Channel and "Building the Biggest: Coasters" on the Discovery Channel.

The Voyage opened to the public on May 6, 2006. It originally operated with three, 28-passenger trains manufactured by the Philadelphia Toboggan Company (PTC). The first twenty-eight seat reservations for the ceremonial first ride were auctioned off on eBay, with proceeds donated to Riley Children's Foundation in Indiana.

Modifications
In November 2009, Holiday World announced that they would be replacing their PTC trains with a new train model called a Timberliner. The new model was under development at the time by Gravitykraft, an affiliate company of The Gravity Group. The park's goal was to improve the ride experience, which had become somewhat rougher over the years as the track aged. Anticipating the arrival of two Timberliners, Holiday World sold two of its three PTC trains from Voyage to Darien Lake, another amusement park seeking replacement trains for one of its own – The Predator. However, The Voyage's new Timberliner trains arrived too late for the 2010 season, so the park decided to move one of the trains from The Raven over to Voyage. The transition required modifications to the train, and the move left The Raven with only one train for the remainder of the season.

For the 2011 season, Holiday World continued with the same train configuration on The Voyage. The original Timberliner model that was tested at Holiday World ended up on other coasters at other parks – Wooden Warrior at Quassy Amusement Park in Connecticut and Twister at Gröna Lund in Sweden. Gravitykraft was instead planning to debut a newer Timberliner model on The Voyage in 2012. The Raven needed to return to normal rider capacity in the meantime, so Holiday World purchased an additional five PTC cars. With their two spares, they were able to construct a full seven-car train to be used on The Voyage and allow the return of the borrowed train back to The Raven.

In 2012, a delivery delay of the new Timberliner model trains prevented the park from adequately testing them in the spring. Holiday World decided to postpone their implementation to the 2013 season. In addition to routine track maintenance, Holiday World worked with The Gravity Group in the 2011-12 off-season to rebuild and reprofile portions of the "spaghetti bowl" turnaround near mid-course. As a result of the reprofiled turn, an additional 0.1 second of air-time was created, raising the ride's new air-time total to 24.3 seconds.

In August 2013, Holiday World officially resigned from the Timberliner project, thanking Gravitykraft for their efforts but announcing that they were no longer pursuing the new trains for use on The Voyage. Instead, they planned to continue using the PTC trains. In 2014, Holiday World shortened the two trains from seven cars to six, and in 2015, the construction of Thunderbird resulted in the installation of netting under Thunderbird's vertical loop to protect Voyage riders passing below.

Characteristics

Station

The Voyage's station is themed as a 17th-century ship, with the basement being the cargo hold, the second level being the deck, and the ride operator's controls being the "Captain's Quarters". The station has three levels: a ground floor, a second floor, and a basement. Before entering the station, guests may be redirected to several outdoor queue switchbacks. Once the switchbacks have been navigated, guests enter the ground floor of the station. The ground floor includes two staircases to the basement; however, most of it is composed of maintenance areas. Depending on the size of the line, the park may or may not open the basement. If the basement is open, guests will walk down the stairs immediately after entering the ground floor of the station. The basement is filled with nothing but queue switchbacks. Once these switchbacks have been navigated, guests will walk up the stairs to the ground floor before continuing up the stairs to the second floor.

The second floor of the station holds the roller coaster's loading and unloading areas, as well as the two transfer tracks and maintenance bays. On the loading side of the station there are fourteen air-powered queue gates, one for each row of the train. On the unloading side of the station there are free shelves and lockers that riders may use to hold their belongings for the duration of the ride. The unloading side is also home to the ride operator's controls and two exit gates: a sliding gate near the front of the train and a swinging gate near the rear of the train. Beyond the unloading side of the station is an area that holds two maintenance bays. These allow unused trains to be stored during normal operation and also provides an additional area for maintenance crews to inspect the roller coaster trains.

Trains
The Voyage uses two blue, 24-passenger trains made by the Philadelphia Toboggan Company. Each train is made up of six cars that hold four riders each. Each car has two rows holding two riders each. Each row has a seat divider that separates the two riders in that row and ensures each rider remains in a position allowing their restraints to work effectively. Since The Voyage uses the same trains that The Raven and The Legend use, the restraints are the same - an individual ratcheting lap bar and an individual, two-point lap belt.

Track
The wooden track on The Voyage is made out of numerous layers of Southern Yellow Pine, topped with a single layer of steel along the top, sides, and underside of the track where the train's wheels make contact. The supports for the track itself are made out of an estimated  of steel. The track features a chain lift hill and five block sections, which theoretically allows a maximum of four trains at a time to run; however, this is impractical when considering the time it takes to dispatch 24-passenger trains. The most trains The Voyage has operated at one time is three. The Voyage uses fin brakes throughout the ride to allow the train to be stopped in the final (primary) brake run, the secondary brake run, the mid-course brake run, the station, and the transfer track.

Gift Shop
Unlike Holiday World's other two wooden roller coasters, The Voyage has a gift shop which is located near its exit. This gift shop offers various merchandise featuring The Voyage and Holiday World & Splashin' Safari. Guests can also visit this gift shop to view and purchase their photo that was taken by the on-ride camera, located right before the drop through the station building.

Ride experience

The total ride experience on The Voyage lasts approximately two minutes and forty-five seconds.

Station to Mid-course brake run
The ride begins with riders in the station facing Plymouth Rock Café. After dispatch, the train immediately passes the transfer track, which is to the left of the main track, and dips down while crossing under the drop into the station fly-under before latching onto the lift hill chain. At the bottom of the drop the train immediately goes over a  airtime hill. At the bottom of the drop the train crosses under the exit from Thunderbird's vertical loop, and then over a  airtime hill.

Immediately at the bottom of the third drop the train enters the first of the five underground tunnels and the first of eight underground moments, during which the track crosses under Thunderbird's heartline roll. After exiting the first tunnel, the train goes over a small hill before entering the second underground tunnel. After exiting the second tunnel, the train goes over yet another hill before diving down into the ride's third underground tunnel. Upon exiting the third tunnel the train enters the "spaghetti bowl" portion of the ride, where the train turns around and begins its return journey. The train first navigates a banked "S" curve to the left and then the right before making a full 180° turn to the left. The train then takes a 90° banked turn to the left, followed immediately by a 90° banked turn to the right. At the completion of the turn, the train makes a small turn to the left and into another underground tunnel. After exiting the tunnel, the train hits the mid-course brake run, where the ride can stop the train in case of an emergency or to prevent block violation.

Mid-Course Brake Run to End

The train's return trip begins with a triple-down drop into an underground tunnel, picking up considerable speed in the process. After exiting the tunnel, the train races toward the station while staying to the left of the track on the outbound hills. This portion goes under the supporting steel for the first three hills, creating multiple headchopper effects, once again crossing under Thunderbird in the same places as on the outbound journey. After crossing back under Thunderbird's loop, the track goes through a series of S-bends under the second airtime hill and the lift hill that culminate in the final 90° banked to the right. Once the train exits the banked turn it passes under the lift hill and takes a turn to the left.

The ride's on-ride camera is located on the left side of the track near this turn. After the train passes the on-ride camera, it flies over the base of the lift hill before making a diving right turn into a tunnel under the station. This underground tunnel goes under the entrance and exit walkways to the ride; it is also located right next to the basement queues, where there is a viewing window where waiting guests can watch the train fly by. After exiting the tunnel the train makes a climbing right turn before quickly shifting to a diving left turn that takes riders into another tunnel under the Thanksgiving midway. Then, after exiting the tunnel, the train makes a climbing, sweeping turn to the right. Once the train exits the turn, it immediately enters the primary brake run, before making a right hand turn into the secondary brake run, before passing through another piece of transfer track to reenter the station.

Records

Awards
In addition to other awards, The Voyage was voted the world's "Best New Ride" at the 2006 Golden Ticket Awards.

Incident
On June 4, 2021, a 47-year-old woman was found unresponsive when the train she was riding in returned to the station. She was taken to a nearby hospital where she later died. An autopsy later determined that the woman tore her right internal thoracic artery, likely caused by the force of the roller coaster, causing a rapid loss of blood.

Pop culture
The heavy metal band Fozzy rode the roller coaster in their song Sane released on May 28, 2021.

References

External links 
 Official website for The Voyage at Holiday World & Splashin' Safari
 Official YouTube video of The Voyage (point-of-view) posted by Holiday World & Splashin' Safari
 Official YouTube video of The Voyage (off-ride) posted by Holiday World & Splashin' Safari

Holiday World & Splashin' Safari
Wooden roller coasters
Roller coasters in Indiana
Roller coasters introduced in 2006
Best New Ride winners